The Battle of the Strait of Otranto of 1917 was the result of an Austro-Hungarian raid on the Otranto Barrage, an Allied naval blockade of the Strait of Otranto. The battle took place on 14–15 May 1917, and was the largest surface action in the Adriatic Sea during World War I. The Otranto Barrage was a fixed barrier, composed of lightly armed drifters with anti-submarine nets coupled with minefields and supported by Allied naval patrols.

The Austro-Hungarian navy planned to raid the Otranto Barrage with a force of three light cruisers and two destroyers under the command of Commander (later Admiral) Miklós Horthy, in an attempt to break the barrier to allow U-boats freer access to the Mediterranean, and Allied shipping. An Allied force composed of ships from three navies responded to the raid and in the ensuing battle, heavily damaged the Austro-Hungarian cruiser . However, the rapid approach of the Austro-Hungarian relief force persuaded Rear Admiral Acton, the Allied commander, to retreat.

Disposition of forces
Under the command of Horthy, three Austro-Hungarian cruisers (Novara, Saida, and Helgoland, modified to resemble large British destroyers) were ordered to attack the drifters on the night of 14 May and attempt to destroy as many as possible before daybreak. The destroyers Csepel and Balaton were to mount a diversionary raid off the Albanian coast in order to confuse any Allied counter-attack. A supporting force composed of the armored cruiser , two destroyers, and four 250t-class torpedo boats was on standby if the raiders ran into trouble. The old pre-dreadnought battleship  and three more 250t-class torpedo boats were also available if necessary.

An Allied destroyer patrol was in the area on the night of 14 May, to the north of the Barrage. The Italian destroyer Borea was also in the area, escorting a small convoy to Valona. A support force was based in the port of Brindisi, consisting of the British cruisers Dartmouth and Bristol and several French and Italian destroyers.

Raid on the drifters

The Italian convoy escorted by Borea was attacked by the Austro-Hungarian destroyers Csepel and Balaton at approximately 03:24. The Austro-Hungarians sank Borea and a munitions ship, and a second was set on fire and abandoned.

The three cruisers were able to pass through the line of drifters, and at 03:30 began attacking the small barrage ships. The Austro-Hungarians frequently gave the drifter crews warning to abandon ship before opening fire. In some instances, the drifter crews chose to fight: Gowan Lee returned fire on the Austro-Hungarian ships. The ship was heavily damaged, but remained afloat; her captain—Joseph Watt—was later awarded the Victoria Cross for his actions during the battle.

There were 47 drifters in Barrage on the night of 14 May; the Austro-Hungarians managed to sink 14 drifters and damage four more. The lack of sufficient Allied escorts forced the withdrawal of the remaining blockading ships, although only for a short time.

Battle
By this time, the Allied naval forces in the area were aware of the raid, and were in a position to block the Austro-Hungarian retreat. Rear Admiral Alfredo Acton—the commanding officer of the Italian Scouting Division—ordered Mirabellos group southward at 04:35, while he embarked on the British light cruiser . The Italian light cruiser , the flotilla leader Racchia, and the destroyers Insidioso, Indomito, and Impavido were readying to sail in support as well.

The Mirabello group engaged the Austro-Hungarian cruisers at 07:00, but were heavily outgunned, and instead attempted to shadow the fleeing cruisers. At 07:45, Rear Admiral Acton's ships encountered the destroyers Csepel and Balaton. After 20 minutes, the Italian destroyers were able to close the distance to the Austro-Hungarian ships; the two groups engaged in a short artillery duel before a shot from Csepel struck Aquila and disabled the ship's boilers. By this time, the Austro-Hungarian destroyers were under the cover of the coastal batteries at Durazzo, and were able to make good their escape.

At 09:00, Bristols lookouts spotted the smoke from the Austro-Hungarian cruisers to the south of her position. The Allied ships turned to engage the Austro-Hungarian ships; the British ships had a superiority both in numbers and in firepower; Dartmouth was armed with eight  guns and Bristol had two 6 inch and ten , compared to the nine  guns on each of the Austro-Hungarian ships. Unfortunately for the Allies, their numerical superiority was quickly lost, as their destroyers were either occupied with mechanical problems, or protecting those destroyers suffering from breakdowns. The support forces of both sides—the Sankt Georg group for the Austro-Hungarians, and the Marsala group for the Allies—were quickly dispatched to the battle. Italian FBA seaplanes from the seaplane carrier Europa shadowed the Austro-Hungarian cruisers and eventually dropped bombs on Helgoland, only scoring a near-miss that dislodged some rivets in her rudder.

Dartmouth—faster than Bristol—closed to effective engagement range with the Austro-Hungarian ships, and opened fire. A shell from Dartmouth struck Novara, at which point the Austro-Hungarian ships laid a smoke screen in order to close the distance. Dartmouth was struck several times, and by 11:00, Acton ordered the ship to reduce speed to allow Bristol to catch up. Novara was hit several more times, and her main feed pumps and starboard auxiliary steam pipe had been damaged, which caused the ship to begin losing speed. At 11:05, Acton turned away in an attempt to separate Saida from Novara and Helgoland. At this point, Sankt Georg was approaching the scene, which prompted Acton to temporarily withdraw to consolidate his forces. This break in the action was enough time for the Austro-Hungarians to save the crippled Novara; Saida took the ship under tow while Helgoland covered them.

Unaware that Novara had been disabled, and fearing that his ships would be drawn too close to the Austrian naval base at Cattaro, Acton broke off the pursuit. The destroyer Acerbi misread the signal, and attempted to launch a torpedo attack, but was driven off by the combined fire of Novara, Saida, and Helgoland. At 12:05, Acton realized the dire situation Novara was in, but by this time, the Sankt Georg group was too close. The Sankt Georg group rendezvoused with Novara, Saida, and Helgoland, and Csepel and Balaton reached the scene as well. The entire group returned to Cattaro together.

At 13:30, the submarine UC-25 torpedoed Dartmouth, causing serious damage. The escorting destroyers forced UC-25 from the area, but Dartmouth had to be abandoned for a period of time, before it could be towed back to port. The French destroyer  attempted to pursue the German submarine, but struck a mine laid by UC-25 that morning and sank rapidly.

Aftermath

As a result of the raid, it was decided by the British naval command that unless sufficient destroyers were available to protect the barrage, the drifters would have to be withdrawn at night. The drifters would only be operating for less than twelve hours a day, and would have to leave their positions by 15:00 every day. Despite the damage received by the Austro-Hungarian cruisers during the pursuit by Dartmouth and Bristol, the Austro-Hungarian forces inflicted more serious casualties on the Allied blockade. In addition to the sunk and damaged drifters, the cruiser Dartmouth was nearly sunk by the German submarine UC-25, the French destroyer Boutefeu was mined and sunk, and a munitions convoy to Valona was interdicted.

However, in a strategic sense, the battle had little effect on the war. The barrage was never particularly effective at preventing the U-boat operations of Germany and Austria-Hungary in the first place. The drifters could cover approximately  apiece; of the -wide Strait, only slightly more than half was covered. The raid risked some of the most advanced units of the Austro-Hungarian fleet on an operation that offered minimal strategic returns.

Footnotes

References

Further reading

(IT) Carlo Stasi, Otranto e l'Inghilterra (episodi bellici in Puglia e nel Salento), in "Note di Storia e Cultura Salentina", anno XV, (Argo, Lecce 2003)
(IT) Carlo Stasi, Otranto nel Mondo. Dal "Castello" di Walpole al "Barone" di Voltaire (Editrice Salentina, Galatina 2018) ,

Mediterranean naval operations of World War I
Naval battles of World War I involving the United Kingdom
Naval battles of World War I involving France
Naval battles of World War I involving Italy
Naval battles of World War I involving Austria-Hungary
Otranto
History of the Adriatic Sea
Conflicts in 1917
May 1917 events
Otranto